Petřiny is a neighbourhood in Prague comprising the oldest panel housing estate in the city. It officially comprises three microdistricts; Petřiny I, part of Veleslavín, and Petřiny II and III, belonging to Břevnov, all belonging to the administrative district Prague 6.

Characteristics 

The housing estate in Petřiny was built between 1959 and 1969, with the intention of housing around 15,000 people, and was designed by architects Evžen Benda and Vojtěch Mixa. It was built on an empty field between the military hospital in Prague, the Obora Hvězda game reserve, and the crossroad at Vypich in Břevnov. The streets were named in 1962 and were initially named after communist personalities and World War II casualties. Notable buildings in the estate include the Macromolecular Chemical Institute (Ústav makromolekulární chemie), in which Otto Wichterle worked, and a memorial to him can be found in front of the building today. Part of the area, as well as a tram stop and a student dormitory, is named Větrník after a windmill which functioned from 1722 to 1905, whose building now serves as a guesthouse. The newest development of buildings in the housing estate, named Sídliště Hvězda, were designed by Vlado Milunić.

Transport 

The area is centered on Na Petřinách street and its tram line, which connects the area to the centre of Prague by public transport. The area is also located nearby Václav Havel Airport, to which it is connected by bus. The extension of the Prague Metro's A line from Dejvická to Motol, opened on April 6, 2015, was included a station at Petřiny.

Nearby districts
 Břevnov
 Liboc
 Vokovice
 Veleslavín
 Střešovice
 Strahov
 Motol
 Bílá Hora

References

External links 
 Photos of the windmill at Větrník

Districts of Prague